Saviers Peak, at  above sea level is the highest peak in the Smoky Mountains of Idaho. The peak is also located in Sawtooth National Recreation Area south of Galena Summit.

No trails lead near Saviers Peak, and it is most easily accessed from the north at the Titus Lake trailhead along Idaho State Highway 75.

References

External links 
 Idaho Summits - Thompson Peak
 Sawtooth National Forest - Official Site
 SummitPost.org - Thompson Peak

Mountains of Blaine County, Idaho
Mountains of Idaho
Sawtooth National Forest